Sport in Ireland plays an important role in Irish society. The many sports played and followed in Ireland include Gaelic games (including Gaelic football, hurling and camogie), association football, horse racing, show jumping, greyhound racing, basketball, fishing, handball, motorsport, boxing, tennis, hockey, golf, rowing, cricket, and rugby union.

In terms of participation, association football (soccer) is the most popular team pursuit for males at 8.8% with Gaelic football attracting 3.4%. Personal exercise (at 13.4%) and running (8.9%) are the most popular individual male activities. Traditionally, team sports do not figure highly amongst females, with a greater percentage of post-school-age women choosing individual sports and fitness activities. As of 2018, additional funding and focus was afforded to females in sport, with a number of successes in women's international sporting competitions. Association football (soccer) is the most played team sport in Ireland. Gaelic football, hurling, golf, aerobics, cycling, swimming and billiards/snooker are the other sporting activities with the highest levels of playing participation in the Republic of Ireland.

In terms of support and attendance, Gaelic football accounted for 34% of total sports attendances at events in the Republic of Ireland in 2003, followed by hurling at 23%, association football (soccer) at 16% and rugby at 8%. In 2005, Initiative's ViewerTrack study measuring sports audiences showed that Gaelic football's highest-profile match, the All-Ireland Football Championship Final, was the most watched event of the nation's sporting year.

In terms of funding, of the €62 million allocated in the Irish government's 2017 Capital Sports Programme, approximately €25 million was allocated to hurling, football and other games overseen by the Gaelic Athletic Association, €7.7 million to soccer, €3.3 million to rugby, €2.8 million to tennis, golf €2.4 million, sailing and rowing €1.3 million each, boxing and athletics over €1 million each, swimming €0.5 million, with the remainder allocated among other sports and sporting groups.

As Northern Ireland is a constituent nation of the United Kingdom, it also sends a Northern Ireland Team to the Commonwealth Games. At the Olympic Games, a person from Northern Ireland can choose to represent either Ireland or Great Britain.

Gaelic games

In a survey released in January 2021, Gaelic games were collectively identified as "Ireland's favourite sport(s)".

Gaelic football

The sport may be referred to as Gaelic football or Gaelic, if confusion might otherwise arise with association football. Though it has existed for centuries in Ireland as Caid, Gaelic football was formally arranged into an organised playing code by the Gaelic Athletic Association (GAA) in the late nineteenth century. It is the most popular sport in Ireland

The game is played at underage, minor (under 18), under 21 and adult levels. All players are amateur, although players at a high level may receive income from sources such as sponsorship and grants. Gaelic footballers play for a local club or parish team, with the best chosen for the inter-county sides. County players may be chosen to play in inter-provincial Railway Cup games or for the 'International Rules' team to face Australia. The main national competitions are the inter-county All-Ireland Senior Football Championship and National Football League, also known as the NFL.

A Gaelic football year starts with pre-season competitions and the NFL. In early summer, the Championship begins. Each of the four provinces has its own tournament, and teams which are knocked out must do well in the 'qualifiers' if they are to gain a spot along with the four Provincial Champions in the All-Ireland quarter-finals. The All-Ireland Senior Football final is traditionally held on the third Sunday in September. Kerry are football's most successful team, with 37 All-Ireland senior titles. There are a number of rivalries within the game – an example is that between Dublin and Meath. Other notable derbies or rivalries include Cork v Kerry, Mayo v Galway, Kerry v Dublin and Tyrone v Donegal.

Hurling 
Hurling is a sport native to Ireland for several thousand years, organized by the Gaelic Athletic Association. In terms of attendance figures, hurling is second only to Gaelic football. Hurling is the fastest field sport in the world.

The game has similarities to shinty and hockey. However the ball (or sliotar) is rarely played along the ground. Hurling is played on a large grass pitch.

Many aspects of the organisation of hurling are similar to football, as both sports are organised by the GAA. Amateurism and the club/county/province structure are similar. Gaelic football has a larger footprint in terms of top-level competition, but in several counties where both sports are played, hurling sometimes holds precedence, and in certain parts of the country, it is the dominant game (Kilkenny, rural Antrim, Ards peninsula in County Down, and Clare, for example). Hurling is well-attended at elite level and the highest-level games fill Croke Park to its capacity of over 82,000. The main competitions are the All-Ireland Senior Hurling Championship, the Leinster and Munster provincial championships and the National Hurling League (NHL).

Hurling and camogie are both included on UNESCO's Representative List of the Intangible Cultural Heritage of Humanity.

Camogie 

Camogie, played exclusively by women, is similar to hurling although a smaller sliotar is used, there is the option to hand-pass into the goal, and the dress code requires players to wear a skort. The first game of camogie was played in County Meath in 1904.

Gaelic handball 
Gaelic handball, or simply 'handball', like the related sport of American handball, somewhat resembles squash or racquetball, but with the ball played or struck with the hand or fist instead of a racquet. It has no connection with the Olympic sport of handball which has limited following in Ireland, where it is generally known as Olympic handball.

In Ireland, there are four main types of handball. These are 40x20 (small court), the traditional 60x30 Softball and Hardball (big alley) and One-wall handball. Handball is played with a variety of balls. Gloves and eyeguards are compulsory for some competitions. The sport is managed and promoted by GAA Handball, a subsidiary body of the GAA.

Rounders 
Rounders is regulated by the Gaelic Athletic Association (GAA) in Ireland, and is similar to baseball. Game-play centers around innings where teams alternate at turns being batters and fielders. Points ("rounders") are scored by the batting team by completing a circuit around the field through four bases

Association football

Association football is a popular sport in the Republic of Ireland and Northern Ireland but while international matches play before large crowds, and are passionately followed, domestic league games typically attract smaller attendances. English football leagues are also popular in Ireland, with a survey in February 2020 indicating that up to 40,000 Irish fans travel to games in England on a "regular basis".

The national body in the Republic of Ireland is the Football Association of Ireland (FAI) while the national body in Northern Ireland is the Irish Football Association (IFA).

The domestic leagues are the League of Ireland (in the Republic) and the NIFL Premiership (or Irish League) (Northern Ireland). Some of the major teams in Ireland include Shamrock Rovers, Dundalk FC and Shelbourne FC in the Republic, Glentoran and Linfield in Northern Ireland, and Derry City, a team from the North who play in the League of Ireland. Due to the financial incentives abroad, most of Ireland's top players, such as Damien Duff, John O'Shea, Aiden McGeady and Jonny Evans, play in the leagues of larger European countries, particularly in England and Scotland. This, along with the Irish media's huge coverage of the English league, is one of the reasons why Irish people tend to support leading British clubs such as Manchester United, Liverpool and Celtic. Only occasionally does a League of Ireland or Irish League player make either of the national teams, despite the fact that the leagues sometimes produce some of Ireland's top players including internationals Kevin Doyle, Shane Long and Gareth McAuley and players like Roy Keane in the past.

On the international stage, the Republic of Ireland and Northern Ireland teams have both competed in three FIFA World Cups, with the Republic also appearing in three European Championships, most recently in 2016.

The Milk Cup is an international youth tournament held annually in Northern Ireland, in which clubs and national teams from elsewhere in the world may compete. Northern Ireland also played host to the 2005 UEFA Under-19 European Championships.

Rugby union

Rugby union is played and supported throughout Ireland, and is especially popular in urban areas such as Dublin, Limerick and Cork. Rugby union is played at club, province and national levels. The Ireland national team is composed of players from both Northern Ireland and the Republic, and the Irish Rugby Football Union governs the sport throughout the island. 

Success at international level and the establishment of four professional teams has increased interest in rugby union as a sport in Ireland. At the 2018 World Rugby Awards, Ireland had been presented with a 'hat-trick' of awards, with Johnny Sexton winning the Player of the Year, Joe Schmidt the Coach of the Year, and the national squad the Team of the Year awards. As of July 2022, following two defeats of New Zealand, the Ireland national rugby union team was ranked 1st in the World Rugby Rankings.

School rugby union is also played at primary and secondary level, and traditional rugby playing schools include: St Michael's College, Blackrock College, Belvedere College, Castleknock College, Clongowes Wood College, St Mary's College, and Terenure College in Dublin, Crescent College, Castletroy College, St Munchin's College, Glenstal Abbey and Ardscoil Rís in Limerick, Rockwell College in Tipperary, Presentation Brothers College, Bandon Grammar School and Christian Brothers College in Cork, and Campbell College, Royal Belfast Academical Institution and Methodist College Belfast in the north.

Boxing 

Boxing is overseen by the Boxing Union of Ireland and Irish Athletic Boxing Association. Amateur boxers account for sixteen of Ireland's 31 Olympic medals, including two Olympic gold medals. Ireland's amateur boxers have also won medals at numerous top level competitions worldwide including World Senior Championships, European Senior Championships, World Junior Championships, World Youth Championships, European Junior Championships and European Youth Championships.

The country's most successful boxers include Steve Collins, Bernard Dunne, Barry McGuigan, Michael Carruth, Ryan Burnett, Andy Lee, John Duddy, Carl Frampton , Kellie Harrington and Katie Taylor. The latter is among the world's most successful female boxers, and Taylor has won five European Championships and four World Championships, as well as the inaugural women's lightweight gold at the 2012 Olympics.

Athletics 

Athletics in Ireland is governed by Athletics Ireland, and in Northern Ireland by Athletics Northern Ireland. Athletics has seen some of the Ireland's highest performers at the Olympics, with several Irish athletes performing well for both the Republic of Ireland and Great Britain & Northern Ireland at the games over the years. Denis Horgan won the shot put 13 times at the AAAs, (still holding a title for greatest number of individual titles won), before emigrating to the United States where he won a number of American titles. Horgan also broke the world record on several occasions and silver at the 1908 Olympics. Dr. Pat O'Callaghan (also from North Cork) won the hammer throw in 1928 and again in 1932 at the Olympic Games. Bob Tisdall also won gold for Ireland in 1932, competing in the 400m hurdles. In the late 20th and early 21st century, notable athletes have included Ron Delany, Mary Peters, John Treacy, Eamonn Coghlan, Sonia O'Sullivan and Robert Heffernan.

The Dublin Marathon and Belfast Marathon are run annually and are two of the most popular athletics events in the country. The Women's Mini Marathon in Dublin consistently gets upwards of 40000 competitors.

Equestrian 

The various equestrian sports have a sizeable following in Ireland. After Gaelic games, horse racing is the second most attended sport in the country, with around 1.3 million attendees annually. That is the largest number of horseracing fans in any country on a per capita basis. 

The governing body is Horse Sport Ireland (formerly the Equestrian Federation of Ireland), which is composed of 15 Irish affiliate bodies, representing all facets of equestrian sport. These sports include show jumping, eventing, dressage, endurance riding, para-equestrian, polo and carriage driving.

Overall administration of Irish horse-racing is carried out by Horse Racing Ireland. Horse Racing Ireland is responsible for racing in both the Republic of Ireland, which has 24 racecourses, and in Northern Ireland, which has 2 racecourses. Ireland's top tracks are the Curragh and Fairyhouse. The breeding industry (including the world's largest thoroughbred breeding operation, Coolmore Stud) has produced many top race horses.

Golf 

As of the early 21st century, golf is among the most-played sports in the country, with a 2008 report for the Irish Sports Council indicating that golf was then the fourth most popular sport by participation rate. Ireland was the first country to organise the sport on a national basis, with two "oldest governing bodies in world golf", the Golfing Union of Ireland (GUI) and the Irish Ladies Golf Union (ILGU), being formed in 1891 and 1893 respectively. 

There are over 400 golf clubs throughout the island, and over 300 courses in the Republic of Ireland, and (as of 2009) Ireland reportedly had the fourth most golf courses per capita in the world, Among Ireland's most famous golf courses are Royal County Down Golf Club, Royal Portrush Golf Club, Portmarnock, Ballybunion and Lahinch. The most prestigious tournament of Ireland is the Irish Open, which is held on courses in the four provinces. Also, the K Club in County Kildare hosted the European Open from 1995 to 2007. Golf is regularly televised in Ireland, with both domestic and international events broadcast.

Ireland produced several top golfers in the late 20th and early 21st century, with players like Pádraig Harrington, Paul McGinley and Shane Lowry achieving significant success internationally. For example, Harrington and McGinley won the World Cup of Golf in 1997 and, together with Clarke, were part of the European team that successfully defended the 2006 Ryder Cup. Harrington also won The Open Championship (British Open) in 2007 and 2008, and the 2008 PGA Championship. Clarke and Lowry won the 2011 Open Championship and 2019 Open Championship respectively.

Three other golfers from Northern Ireland have had international successes in the 21st century. Rory McIlroy has several major tournament wins, including the 2011 U.S. Open. He was world number one in the Official World Golf Ranking for 95 weeks. Graeme McDowell won the 2010 U.S. Open, becoming the first Irish player to do so. Darren Clarke won the 2011 Open Championship.

Cricket 

Cricket has been played in Ireland since the early 19th century, and the game against Scotland (a match which has first-class status) has been played annually since 1909.

The sport is organised on an all-island basis and is overseen by the Irish Cricket Union, founded in its present incarnation in 1923. Ireland has entered some domestic English tournaments since the early 1980s, but becoming an Associate Member of the International Cricket Council in 1993 paved the way for participation in international competition. Ireland co-hosted the 1999 Cricket World Cup. It is most popular in Northern Ireland and Dublin.

The Ireland cricket team was among the associate nations that qualified for the 2007 Cricket World Cup. It defeated Pakistan and finished second in its pool, earning a place in the Super 8 stage of the competition. The team also competed in the 2009 ICC World Twenty20, and won the 2009 ICC World Cup Qualifier to secure a place in the 2011 Cricket World Cup. Kevin O'Brien scored the fastest century in World Cup history (113 runs off 63 balls), as Ireland produced one of the great upsets to defeat England by 3 wickets in the 2011 tournament. In 2017, domestic cricket in Ireland was recognized as first-class cricket for the first time, and was granted Test status in 2017.

Prior to the granting of Test status, a number of Irish cricketers went to England to play Test cricket, including Eoin Morgan from Dublin, who captained the English cricket team to 2019 Cricket World Cup success.

Field hockey 

Field hockey (known in Ireland as just "hockey") is played throughout the country, particularly in secondary schools. The governing body in Ireland is the Irish Hockey Association. The Ireland women's national field hockey team reached the final of the Women's Hockey World Cup in 2018. As of 2018, the Ireland men's national field hockey team were ranked 10th in the FIH World Rankings.

Other sports

Australian rules football 

Australian rules football has gained a following in Ireland which has increased mainly due to the International rules series that takes place annually between Australia and Ireland. In October 2000, the Australian Rules Football League of Ireland was established, and a representative Irish team took part in the 2005 Australian Football International Cup.
The Irish Green Machine became inaugural International champions in 2002. They have been finalists in every AFL International Cup since and were 2011 International Cup champions. Belfast and Dublin have been hosts to the AFL Euro Cup.

Chess 
The Irish Chess Union (ICU), formed in 1912, is the governing body for chess in Ireland and a member of FIDE since 1933 and the European Chess Union. The ICU promotes Chess in Ireland and maintains the chess rating for players in Ireland, which are published three times a year. It runs competitions such as the Irish Chess Championship and selects teams to participate in international competitions for Ireland.

Croquet 
Croquet was first played in Ireland in the 1830s. The governing association of the sport is the Croquet Association of Ireland. Most international matches and large tournaments are played at the Carrickmines Lawn Tennis and Croquet Club, near Dublin.

Cycling 
There are many regional cycling clubs throughout the country and competitions are organised regularly, the largest non-professional event being the Rás (Irish for race). The main governing body is Cycling Ireland which is responsible for cycling throughout the island. Ireland's most famous cyclists are Stephen Roche, who won both the Tour de France and Giro d'Italia in 1987; and Sean Kelly, who won the Vuelta a España in 1988, the sprinter's green jersey in the Tour de France four times, the Paris-Nice seven times in succession as well as four of the five 'Monuments'.
Mountain biking is supported by a number of dedicated trail centers in Wicklow, Dublin, Galway and Tipperary. For competitive mountain bikers, there is a National Cross-Country series, a National Downhill series and a National Enduro series. BMX events are undertaken at the Ratoath BMX track in County Meath, and an indoor BMX track in Cherry Orchard in County Dublin.

Darts 
The Irish National Darts Organisation (INDO) is a governing body for Irish darts and is recognised by the World Darts Federation and British Darts Organisation.

Extreme sports 
Extreme sports undertaken in Ireland include skateboarding, rollerblading, surfing, BMX, mountain biking, mountain boarding, kitesurfing and wakeboarding. Several of these sports have national governing bodies, such as the Irish Surfing Association, and national competitions, such as mountainbiking's national series.

Since 2005, skateparks (for skateboarding, rollerblading, and other sports) have been developed in several places, including in Greystones, Bushy park (Dublin) and Lucan (Dublin). Modular parks can be found in other parts of Ireland.

Greyhound racing 

Greyhound racing began in Ireland in 1927; there were greyhound races in Celtic Park in Belfast on 18 April of that year and the Shelbourne Park greyhound stadium opened in Dublin four weeks later. Hare coursing was already a well established sport in the country and greyhounds were bred for racing in Ireland from the very start. Mick the Miller, winner of the English Derby in 1929 and 1930, was an Irish greyhound and Ireland continues to export greyhounds.

There are twenty licensed greyhound stadiums in Ireland. There are seventeen in the Republic where the licensing authority is Bord na gCon, the Irish Greyhound Board. This is a semi-state body and was established by the Irish government in 1958. The three stadiums in Northern Ireland are licensed by the Irish Coursing Club, which also organises hare coursing throughout the Island.

Gymnastics 

Gymnastics is governed by Irish Gymnastics which was formed in 1999, following the merging of the Irish Amateur Gymnastics Association and the Irish Sports Acrobatics Federation. There are 83 registered gymnastics clubs in Ireland (including Northern Ireland). Gymnastics includes four Olympic disciplines, women's artistic gymnastics, men's artistic gymnastics, trampoline gymnastics, and rhythmic gymnastics, and four non-Olympic disciplines, acrobatic gymnastics, tumbling gymnastics, gymnastics for all, and sports aerobics. The most successful Irish gymnast ever is Rhys McClenaghan.  In 2019, he became the first Irish gymnast to qualify to a world championships final and to also win a medal, taking bronze on pommel horse. In addition to his world medal, McClenaghan is the first Irish gymnast to compete in a European final and also the first to win a European medal. In 2019, he qualified for the 2020 Olympics in Tokyo.

Kendo 
While still a minority sport in Ireland, there are a number of Kendo clubs based in Dublin, Cork, Galway and Cavan. The Irish Kendo Federation is the governing body for the country. The Irish National Kendo Squad participates in the European Kendo Championships and the World Kendo Championships, as well as other international competitions.  The main Kendo event in Ireland is the annual Irish National Championships (INC) which takes place in June each year.

Kendo in Northern Ireland is governed by the British Kendo Association (BKA).

Martial arts 
The National Governing Body of Martial Arts in Ireland, as appointed by the Irish Sports Council, is the Irish Martial Arts Commission. The Irish Martial Arts Commission represents the martial arts of Aikido, Ju-Jitsu, Karate, Kendo, Kickboxing, Kung-Fu, TaeKwon-Do, Ninjutsu, Sambo and Tai Chi. The Executive Committee of the Irish Martial Arts Commission is made up of 2 representative elected within the membership of each Martial Art.

Taekwondo and Karate are represented by various clubs throughout the country. The All-Ireland Taekwondo Association works to promote the sport and to organise competitions. Kickboxing Ireland (formally known as Allstyles Kickboxing Association of Ireland) was founded in 1985 to unify and structure the sport in Ireland.  It was recognised by the Irish Sports Council as a national governing body of sport in 1993 under the auspices of the Irish Martial Arts Commission.

Motorsport 
Motorsport also has a presence in Ireland with Motorsport Ireland being the governing body throughout the country. Rallying is one popular form of motorsport, with three major Rally Championships taking place every year, each hosting 6-7 rally events across the country. These include the Donegal International Rally, West Cork Rally, Galway International Rally and others. Ireland also hosted a round of the World Rally Championship in 2007 and 2009, with stages being held in the Republic and also across the border in Northern Ireland, and was a stage candidate in 2016.

Circuit racing is also present in the country with Ireland having only one international venue, Mondello Park in County Kildare which formerly hosted rounds of several international events and still hosts national events today. The country has produced many drivers who climbed the international ladder such as Derek Daly, Peter Dempsey, Tommy Byrne, Eddie Jordan and David Kennedy. Kart racing and stock car racing are also a popular forms of circuit racing in Ireland.

Motorcycle racing in Ireland is governed by Motorcycling Ireland. Established in 1902, it is the oldest motorcycle sport federation in the world.

Olympic Handball 
Olympic Handball is a minority sport in Ireland, with the Irish Olympic Handball Association acting as the national governing body. In 2011, Ireland hosted the European Challenge Trophy in Olympic Handball (a competition for developing nations).

Orienteering 
Orienteering in Ireland is regulated by the Irish Orienteering Association. Every two years, the Shamrock o-Ringen, Ireland's largest Orienteering event, is held in Cork or Kerry. Irish orienteers compete at all levels, sometimes reaching the finals at the World Orienteering Championships.

Pitch and putt 
The sport of pitch and putt originated in Cork in the 1930s, and was developed throughout Ireland during the 1940s. Since 1960 it has been overseen by the Pitch and Putt Union of Ireland, in turn a member of the European Pitch and Putt Association and Federation of International Pitch and Putt Associations. The Ireland men's national pitch and putt team won the 2008 Pitch and Putt World Cup.

Racquet sports 

Tennis, badminton, racquetball and squash are common in Ireland. In Tennis, Tennis Ireland is the governing body and runs several competitions between the approximately 200 clubs throughout Ireland. Ireland competes in tennis internationally in the Davis Cup (men's) and the Fed Cup (ladies). Ireland had had a prominent tennis tournament, the Irish Open, in the past, which was considered an important tournament prior to the establishment of world championship events in 1913. The men's event was abolished in 1979, and the women's event was abolished in 1983 - however, it remains as a lower-tier ITF tournament. Badminton in Ireland is run by the BUI.

Road bowling 
Irish Road Bowling is an ancient sport. It is centred in Ireland (particularly Cork and Armagh) but is also played in the United States and the United Kingdom. Similar sports are played in the Netherlands, Germany and Italy and since the 1960s there have been international championships held with athletes participating from these countries.

Rowing 
Rowing is an Olympic Sport which is regulated by Rowing Ireland. During the winter there are Head of the River Races (processional timed races) and during the summer there are Regattas (side by side racing). The Irish Championships are held at the National Rowing Centre in Cork.

Rugby League 

Rugby league in Ireland is governed by Rugby League Ireland, which runs the Irish Elite League (known as the Carnegie League for sponsorship purposes), which is the top level rugby league competition in Ireland. There are approximately 20 teams across Ulster, Munster and Leinster. The Irish rugby league team compete in the European Cup and the Rugby League World Cup. It is made up predominantly of players based in Great Britain. Ireland reached the quarter-finals of the 2000 Rugby League World Cup and the 2008 Rugby League World Cup.

Sailing 
Sailing in Ireland is governed and regulated by the Irish Sailing Association in Dún Laoghaire. Events are organised by the various clubs on the coasts and on the reservoirs and lakes. The first sailing club was the Cork Water Club (now the Royal Cork Yacht Club), which was founded in 1720.

Snooker and pool 
Snooker and pool hold some interest in Ireland, with media coverage of most major international tournaments. The Republic of Ireland and Northern Ireland have produced some of the world's most successful snooker players, including Ken Doherty, Alex Higgins and Dennis Taylor.

Target shooting 
Target shooting in Ireland comprises a number of disciplines. These include the Olympic rifle and pistol shooting disciplines (administered by the NTSA), metallic silhouette shooting (administered by the NSAI), precision pistol, benchrest rifle, gallery rifle and sporting rifle disciplines (administered by the NASRPC), the Tetrathlon (administered by the Pony Club) and Olympic Penthathlon (administered by the Modern Pentathlon Association of Ireland), both Olympic and non-Olympic clay pigeon shooting (administered by the ICPSA) and various long-range rifle shooting disciplines (administered by the NRAI).

Ireland has had representation at international target shooting competitions, including the Olympic Games. The Irish Olympic clay pigeon team won the World Championships team event in Olympic Trap in 2002 and Irish shooter Philip Murphy claimed the silver medal in the 2007 World Shotgun Championships; he has also placed in the top ten in two World Championships and two World Cups. His teammate Derek Burnett won silver in the 2007 World Cup in Maribor and has placed in the top ten in three World Championships, two World Cup Finals and two European championships. Another teammate, David Malone, won gold in the 2004 World Cup in Cairo, and has ranked in the top ten in two World Championships, one World Cup Final and five World Cups. The team has also won several World Cup medals in both team and individual events. The clay pigeon high performance director has also been appointed head of the ISSF coaches' committee and the head clay target instructor with the ISSF Training Academy. Ian O'Sullivan also became the World Junior Champion in Olympic Trap in the 2014 World Championships.

Ireland became world champions in Centrefire Gallery Rifle in the inaugural World Championships in 2013, in which the Irish team beat Great Britain and Germany. Gallery Rifle events are administered in Ireland by the NASRPC.

Triathlon and adventure racing 
The triathlon, as well as the duathlon, pentathlon, and decathlon, are gaining interest in Ireland. The Irish Triathlon calendar of events runs to 200 events annually. The national body for the triathlon is Triathlon Ireland which organises competitions between various clubs throughout the country.

The Modern Pentathlon Association of Ireland was set up in 2004. Pentathlon and Decathlon are track and field events and organised by an athletic association, whereas Triathlon and Duathlon are organized by multi sport associations such as National Governing bodies for Triathlon and the ITU, International Triathlon Union.

Adventure racing also takes place in Ireland. The majority of adventure races in Ireland fall into what's often called multisport, with run, cycle and kayak stages in events like WAR (Wicklow Adventure Race) and Gaelforce West, which are won in under 4 hours. There are also a few longer international-style adventure races lasting 24 hours and 36 hours, events like Beast of Ballyhoura and Cooley Raid.

Tug of war 
Tug of war has been in Ireland for a long time and the creation of the Irish Tug of War Association in 1967 boosted the competition among clubs in Ireland and also enabled Ireland to compete in international events, such as the Tug of War International Federation (TWIF) World Championships.

Underwater sports 

Ireland, being an island on the western edge of Europe and on the continental shelf, is well-suited for recreational diving activities such as scuba diving and snorkelling. The dive season in Ireland generally starts around March and ends around October.

Recreational diving started in Ireland in the early 1950s with the founding of the Belfast Branch of the British Sub Aqua Club.
In the early 1960s, diving clubs in the Republic of Ireland formed the Comhairle Fo-Thuinn (CFT) (English: Irish Underwater Council).  This voluntary body regulates all aspects of diving for its members, is the national governing body recognised by the Irish Government and represents the Republic of Ireland at the Confédération Mondiale des Activités Subaquatiques (World Underwater Federation).  The Northern Ireland Federation of Sub-Aqua Clubs which was formed in 1975 is the corresponding national governing body in Northern Ireland.

As of October 2013, underwater hockey is the only underwater sport being practised. This activity is limited to the Republic of Ireland where regional competition takes place in both Dublin and Cork.  Irish national teams have played internationally with attendance at European championships.

Water sports 

Water sports practised in Ireland include canoeing, swimming, surfing, diving, water polo, sailing, and kayaking. Whilst many people participate in these, few do so competitively. Ireland has had only one Olympic medalist in swimming, Michelle Smith, and her medals have since been tarnished by drug allegations. The National Aquatic Centre was opened in Ireland in 2003 and held the European SC Championships in December 2003 – the first time the country hosted such a competition. At the competition, Ireland won its first medal at the European SC Championships ever, a silver in the 200m breaststroke by Andrew Bree. The National Aquatic Centre also hosted the 2018 World Para Swimming European Championships. Swim Ireland is the national governing body of swimming in Ireland.

Winter Sports 
The Ski Club of Ireland is the national snowsports centre for Ireland, and consists of four outdoor dry slopes in Kilternan, Dublin. A team representing Ireland has competed at the Winter Olympic Games since 1992.

North American sports

Baseball 

Baseball is an emerging sport in Ireland. The Irish National Baseball Team won the bronze medal at the 2004 European Championships in Germany and followed up that performance with a silver medal in the 2006 European Championships in Belgium. In 2018, the team won the C Pool in European Championships in Ashbourne, County Meath to advance to the B Pool in 2019.

On a club level, baseball is organized through Baseball Ireland, which operates an adult league established in 1997 with teams in Dublin, Greystones and Belfast. Irish baseball was the subject of an award-winning documentary The Emerald Diamond in 2006.

Basketball 
See also Ireland national basketball team
Basketball is overseen by Basketball Ireland. This governing body organises the sport's main competitions such as the Super League. The main basketball arena in Ireland is the National Basketball Arena in Dublin. The sport receives small amounts of media attention, with a few games broadcast on television annually. Basketball is mainly driven by school, college and club support. Pat Burke is the only Irish born to play in the NBA, he played for Orlando Magic and Phoenix Suns.

Ice hockey 
There is one professional ice hockey team in Northern Ireland, the Belfast Giants, playing in the Elite Ice Hockey League. The Irish Ice Hockey Association is the national governing body for the sport, and is responsible for the Ireland men's national ice hockey team and Ireland women's national ice hockey team.

Lacrosse 
Lacrosse in Ireland is governed by Ireland Lacrosse, an association which is a member of World Lacrosse and the European Lacrosse Federation. The Irish men's lacrosse team made headlines in 2020 when, after qualifying for the 2022 World Games, the team gave up their place at the competition to allow the Iroquois men's national lacrosse team to participate. The Iroquois team, despite representing the Haudenosaunee Confederacy in which the sport originated, were originally excluded because they did not represent a sovereign nation with an Olympic Committee. The Irish national team refused to take their place at the competition, with the place being allocated to the Iroquois team.

Softball 
See also Softball in Ireland
Softball in Ireland can be traced back as far as 1982, with the first organised competition, the Dublin Softball League, taking place in 1984. The Irish Softball Association is the governing body of softball in Ireland and is responsible for the running of tournaments, Leagues, development and international competition in both co-ed slowpitch and ladies fastpitch softball. The National Team (Co-Ed) has competed at European level since 1998, with the best results being Silver in 2002 and 2004.

Volleyball 
Volleyball has men's, women's, schools' and beach-volleyball participants. The sport is governed by Volleyball Ireland (VLY).
The Northern Ireland Volleyball Association govern the sport in Northern Ireland.
Men, Women and Junior National Teams regularly compete in international competition including the European Small Nations Championship. The NI Men's National Team competed in the first round of the World Championships. Club volleyball is played in several men's and women's divisions (both north and south). Volleyball Ireland (VLY) also run school competitions throughout the school year: a first and second year competition, a cadette competition, a senior competition, and a general schools competition. Spikeball tournaments are also held around the country throughout the school year.

Competitions and events

National 

The various GAA discipline finals are the largest sporting events regularly held in Ireland, in both terms of attendance and media coverage. The biggest national sporting event in Ireland is the final of the All-Ireland Senior Football Championship, held annually in Croke Park, usually in September. It usually attracts a sell out crowd of 82,500 to croke park. Many of the matches in the championship attract crowds of 50,000+, depending on who is playing.

Aside from the GAA, the biggest multi-sport event held in Ireland regularly is the Community Games. The games are organised every year from a local level, where hundreds of thousands of young people compete in different disciplines such as athletics, swimming, and cycling, in the first half of the year. Winners progress to county level, and then to the Community Games finals. The finals are held over two weekends in the summer where over 3,000 children sleep over at a campus-style facility.

International 
On an international level, Ireland has had mixed fortunes, with some successes in the late 20th and early 21st century in rugby union, horse racing, show jumping, amateur boxing, and golf.

Twenty four Irish people have won Olympic medals as of 2012. At the 2004 Summer Olympics, Ireland had one of its smallest contingents in its history at the games, with only 106 individuals participating. This was due to the strict policy followed by the Olympic Council of Ireland of only allowing A time athletes and swimmers to attend the games.

One of the biggest international events in Ireland is international soccer. The Republic's national team first qualified for a FIFA World Cup in 1990, reaching the quarter finals of Italia '90. In rugby union, as of September 2019, Ireland's national team was ranked 1st in the world. Ireland has produced major stars such as Keith Wood, Brian O'Driscoll and Johnny Sexton. In golf, Ireland has produced several top golfers such as Pádraig Harrington.

The traditional Gaelic games of Gaelic football and hurling are played by Irish expats, with increasingly local involvement in communities around the world, however no nation has enough players to compete with Ireland. To compensate for this the GAA has entered into a partnership with the Australian Football League (Australian rules football) and plays a hybrid annual series called International rules football – this series has been going in various forms since 1967. Also the GAA plays an international hurling hybrid match with Scotland's national shinty team (although Ireland do not select players from the best hurling teams in Tier One of the All-Ireland championship for this game).

In 2003, Ireland hosted the Special Olympics World Summer Games, as well as the European SC Championships 2003. In 2006, Ireland hosted the Ryder Cup Matches.

Stadiums 

Ireland's largest stadium is the GAA's Croke Park in Dublin, which can hold 82,300 people. It is the third largest stadium in Europe. Until the late 20th century, it was only used for Gaelic games and concerts. Other GAA facilities capable of accommodating 40,000 or more people are Semple Stadium, Thurles, Gaelic Grounds, Limerick and Páirc Uí Chaoimh, Cork.

International soccer and rugby in the Republic of Ireland are played at the 52,000 capacity Aviva Stadium. Built on the site of the former Lansdowne Road, this all-seated stadium was opened in May 2010. Thomond Park, a rugby ground in Limerick, has been rebuilt into a modern 26,000-capacity stadium, though not all-seated.

Ireland has three Olympic-sized swimming pools – two of which are open to the public. The largest – located at Sports Campus Ireland – is the National Aquatic Centre. Ireland has several large horse and greyhound tracks such as Fairyhouse.

Plans to develop a Northern Ireland stadium at the site of the former Maze prison in County Antrim to cater for Gaelic games, rugby and soccer were scrapped in 2009 after opposition from unionists and soccer fans.

The Ireland national cricket team play One Day Internationals at Stormont in Belfast and at the Clontarf Cricket Club Ground in Dublin. Ireland also plays Intercontinental Cup matches at the Woodvale Road ground, and has played test cricket at Malahide Cricket Club Ground in Dublin.

Media coverage 

Newspapers: All major newspapers dedicate space to sports coverage, particularly to soccer, Gaelic games, rugby union and equestrian events.
Television: Gaelic football, hurling and soccer receive most of the sports coverage on domestic channels. RTÉ Two and TG4 hold rights to broadcast Gaelic games in Ireland. Coverage of the League of Ireland is shared between RTÉ and other channels. TV3 and RTÉ Two both have rights to various European soccer competitions, such as the Champions League and the English Premier League. Satellite and cable subscribers have access to other foreign channels such as Sky Sports, Eurosport and Attheraces.
Magazines: There are relatively few Irish based magazines apart from GAA ones such as the Hogan Stand.

See also 
 Culture of Ireland
 Ireland at the 2004 Summer Olympics
 Sport in Northern Ireland
 Sport in Galway

Notes

Further reading 
 West, Trevor. The bold collegians: the development of sport in Trinity College, Dublin (Lilliput Press in association with DUCAC, 1991).
Croke Park: Cathedral of Sport by Mícheál Ó Muircheartaigh, first printed September 2004 – 
The Ras: Ireland's Unique Bike Race 1953–2003 by Tom Daly, first printed October 2003 – 
Golfing in Ireland: The Most Complete Guide for Adventurous Golfers by Rob Armstrong, first printed May 2000 – 
The Fighting Irish by Roger Anderson, first printed October 2004 – 
Greyhound racing Michael Fortune (2002), in Brian Lalor (Ed.), The Encyclopedia of Ireland. Dublin: Gill and Macmillan.

External links 
 Irish Sports Council
 Department of Transport, Tourism, and Sport 
 Olympic Council of Ireland
 Sport Northern Ireland
 Federation of Irish Sport

 
Irish culture